Tommy Robredo was the defending champion, but chose to compete in Marseille instead.

Juan Carlos Ferrero won in the final against David Ferrer 5–7, 6–4, 6–3.

Seeds

Draw

Finals

Top half

Bottom half

Qualifying

Seeds

Qualifiers

Draw

First qualifier

Second qualifier

Third qualifier

Fourth qualifier

External links
Main Draw Singles
Qualifying Draw

Copa Telmex - Singles
ATP Buenos Aires
2010 Copa Telmex